is a song by Japanese band Gesu no Kiwami Otome. It was released as a single on August 6, 2014, as one of the two A-sides of the band's debut physical single "Ryōkiteki na Kiss o Watashi ni Shite" / "Asobi".

Background and development 

Gesu no Kiwami Otome, after releasing two extended plays with independent label Space Shower Records, released their first major label release in April 2014: the extended play Minna Normal.

The band announced the single "Ryōkiteki na Kiss o Watashi ni Shite" in June 2014. In late July, after the single artwork had already been produced, the single was quickly adapted into a double A-side single, due to the song being picked for a commercial tie-up with au's brand of Isai FL smartphones.

Promotion and release 

Originally "Asobi" was the third track of the single, but was moved to become the second track and was billed in the title, due to the tie-up with au. The au commercials began airing from July 18, 2014.

On August 26, 2014, a music video was released for the song, directed by Yasuyuki Yamaguchi. It was shot entirely using the built-in 4K resolution video camera found on the Isai FL smart phones, and featured footage of the band performing the song.

Critical reception 

Nobuaki Onuki of What's In? felt the song's surprising ensemble was stimulating and "made you feel the moment". He also noted Gesu no Kiwami Otome's "beautiful song construction" that made itself felt in the song.

Track listing

Chart rankings

Sales

Release history

References 

2014 songs
2014 singles
Japanese-language songs
Gesu no Kiwami Otome songs
Songs used as jingles
Songs written by Enon Kawatani
Unborde singles